Kijura is a town in Kabarole District, in the Western Region of Uganda.

Location
The town is in Hakibaale Sub-county, being one of the eight parishes in that administrative unit. The coordinates of the Kijura are 0°49'01.0"N 30°25'03.0"E (Latitude:0.816944; Longitude:30.417500).

Overview
The town is the location of the burial place of Brigadier Noble Mayombo, R.I.P.

References

Populated places in Western Region, Uganda
Cities in the Great Rift Valley
Kabarole District